Andy Heath may refer to:

 Andy Heath (music executive) (born 1947), British music publishing executive
 Andy Heath (puppeteer), British television puppeteer